Malumfashi (or Malum Fashi) is a local government in Katsina State, Nigeria. Its headquarters are in the town of Malumfashi.

It has an area of 674 km2 and a population of 182,920 at the 2006 census. The current chairman of the local government is Alhaji Muktar Ammani and Justice Saddiq Abdullahi Mahuta is  the Galadiman Katsina and District Head of Malumfashi.

The postal code of the area is 822.

The representative to the House of Representatives for the  	Malum Fashi/Kafur constituency is Ibrahim Babangida Mahuta.

Notable people
Justice Saddik Abdullahi Mahuta, the longest serving Chief Judge of Katsina state, from 1991 to 2013 and the 11th Galadiman Katsina, District Head of Malumfashi. 
Sunusi Mamman, Vice Chancellor of Umaru Musa Yar'adua University and Sa'in Galadiman Katsina, hails from Malumfashi local government.

References

.Malumfashi has a good population of native Hausa Christians. They live in peace with their Hausa Muslim neighbors and relatives.

Local Government Areas in Katsina State